Osteocephalus mutabor is a species of frogs in the family Hylidae found on the western Andean foothills of Ecuador and south to Ucayali Region of Peru. Before Osteocephalus mutabor was described as a new species in 2002, it was confused with Osteocephalus leprieurii.

Description
Osteocephalus mutabor males measure  and females  in snout–vent length. Sexual dimorphism is marked: females have a smooth dorsum while males have tubercles hearing spines. The dorsum is tan coloured and has numerous transverse lines or other markings; the pattern is highly variable. Juveniles are markedly different and have red eyes, a broad creamy white interorbital bar, and dorsolateral stripes.

Reproduction
Spawning has been observed in aquarium where mating took place in shallow water. Eggs were released as a clump of 30–40 eggs that floated on the surface and within half an hour had spread to single-layered film. Total fecundity is about 800–1300 eggs.

Habitat and conservation
This arboreal species inhabits primary forests and forest edges at elevations of  asl. It breeds in temporary ponds and slow-moving streams. It may occur in slightly degraded habitats.

References

mutabor
Amphibians of the Andes
Amphibians of Ecuador
Amphibians of Peru
Frogs of South America
Amphibians described in 2002
Taxonomy articles created by Polbot